Senator Robertson may refer to:

Members of the United States Senate
Absalom Willis Robertson (1887–1971), U.S. Senator from Virginia from 1946 to 1966; also served in the Virginia State Senate
Edward V. Robertson (1881–1963), U.S. Senator from Wyoming from 1943 to 1949
Thomas J. Robertson (1823–1897), U.S. Senator from South Carolina from 1868 to 1877

United States state senate members
David B. Robertson (fl. 1990s–2010s), Michigan State Senate
George W. Robertson (1838–1906), New York State Senate
Hezekiah D. Robertson (1826–1870), New York State Senate
Jerome B. Robertson (1815–1890), Texas State Senate
John Brownlee Robertson (1809–1892), Connecticut State Senate
John Robertson (congressman) (1787–1873), Virginia State Senate
William A. Robertson (1837–1889), Louisiana State Senate
William H. Robertson (1823–1898), New York State Senate